Events from the year 1817 in the United States.

Incumbents

Federal Government 
 President: James Madison (DR-Virginia) (until March 4), James Monroe (DR-Virginia) (starting March 4)
 Vice President: vacant (until March 4), Daniel D. Tompkins (DR-New York) (starting March 4)
 Chief Justice: John Marshall (Virginia)
 Speaker of the House of Representatives: Henry Clay (DR-Kentucky)
 Congress: 14th (until March 4), 15th (starting March 4)

Events

January–March
 February 7 – Baltimore becomes the first U.S. city with public street gas lighting.
 March 3 
President James Madison vetoes John C. Calhoun's Bonus Bill.
U.S. Congress passes law to split the Mississippi Territory, after Mississippi drafts a constitution, creating the Alabama Territory effective in August.
 March 4 – James Monroe is sworn in as the fifth President of the United States, and Daniel D. Tompkins is sworn in as Vice President of the United States.

April–June
 April 15 – The first American school for the deaf opens in Hartford, Connecticut.
 April 29 – The Rush–Bagot Treaty, between the U.S. and the United Kingdom, is signed.
 May – The General Convention of the Episcopal Church founds the General Theological Seminary while meeting in New York City.
 June 18 – Henry Perry, a former member of the Republican Army of the North, is defeated near Coleto Creek after leading a force to capture Presidio La Bahía.

July–September

 July 4 – At Rome, New York, construction on the Erie Canal begins.
 July 12 –  Benjamin Russell, in his Columbian Centinel newspaper, coins the phrase "Era of Good Feelings", which is later used to describe American politics from 1817 to 1825.
 August 15 – By act of the U.S. Congress (March 3), the Alabama Territory is created by splitting the Mississippi Territory in half, on the day the Mississippi constitution is drafted, four months before Mississippi becomes a U.S. state.

October–December
 November 20 – The first Seminole War begins in Florida.
 December 10 – Mississippi is admitted as the 20th U.S. state, formerly the Mississippi Territory. (see History of Mississippi). Then Alabama Territory is effective.
 December 30 – Hawaii plants coffee for the first time.

Undated
 John Neal published Keep Cool, A Novel, the first American work of fiction to use natural diction.
 Hoffman's Course of Legal Study is published in Baltimore.

Ongoing
 First Seminole War (1817–1818)
 Era of Good Feelings (1817–1825)

Births
 February 7 – LeRoy Pope Walker, 1st Confederate States Secretary of War (died 1884)
 February 8 – Richard S. Ewell, Confederate general (died 1872)
 March 22 – Braxton Bragg, Confederate general (died 1876)
 March 26 – Herman Haupt, railroad civil engineer (died 1905)
 July 1 – Hugh J. Jewett, railroad president and politician (died 1898)
 July 12 – Henry David Thoreau, author, poet, philosopher, naturalist, environmentalist, surveyor, historian, abolitionist, tax resister and transcendentalist (died 1862)
 August 4 – Frederick Theodore Frelinghuysen, 29th United States Secretary of State (died 1885)
 August 14 – Alexander H. Bailey, politician (died 1874)
 September 13 – John M. Palmer, U.S. Senator for Illinois from 1891 to 1897 (died 1900)
 October 2 – Webster Wagner, inventor, manufacturer and politician (died 1883)
 October 28 – Cornelius Mathews, writer (died 1889)
 November 3 – Leonard Jerome, entrepreneur (grandfather of Winston Churchill) (died 1891)
 November 17 – Benjamin Champney, landscape painter (died 1907)
 November 19 – James A. McDougall, U.S. Senator from California from 1861 to 1867 (died 1867)
 December 23 – Warren Felt Evans, writer (died 1889)
 December 29 – Eli M. Saulsbury, U.S. Senator from Delaware from 1871 to 1889 (died 1893)
 December 31 – James T. Fields, publisher (died 1881)
 Date unknown – George R. Riddle, U.S. Senator from Delaware from 1864 to 1867, civil engineer and lawyer (died 1867)

Deaths
 January 16 – Alexander J. Dallas, statesman and financier (born 1759)
 May 12 – William Goforth, physician and paleontologist (born 1766)
 June 24 – Thomas McKean, lawyer, President of the Continental Congress, and signatory of the Declaration of Independence (born 1734)
 August 7 – Pierre Samuel du Pont de Nemours, French-born industrialist (born 1739)
 September 18 – William Charles Wells, physician (born 1757)
 September 23 – Solomon Metcalf Allen, professor of languages, killed in fall from college roof (born 1789)
 Date unknown – Caleb Bingham, textbook author (born 1757)

See also
Timeline of United States history (1790–1819)

References

Further reading
 James C. Jewett. The United States Congress of 1817 and Some of its Celebrities. The William and Mary Quarterly, Vol. 17, No. 2 (October, 1908), pp. 139–144
 Marine Hospitals of New England in 1817. Proceedings of the Massachusetts Historical Society, Third Series, Vol. 50, (October, 1916 – June, 1917),
 John E. Iglehart. The Coming of the English to Indiana in 1817 and Their Hoosier Neighbors. Indiana Magazine of History, Vol. 15, No. 2 (1919), pp. 89–178
 Lucius C. Embree. Morris Birkbeck's Estimate of the People of Princeton in 1817. Indiana Magazine of History, Vol. 21, No. 4 (1925), pp. 289–299
 Watt Stewart. The South American Commission, 1817–1818. The Hispanic American Historical Review, Vol. 9, No. 1 (February, 1929), pp. 31–59
 John Perry Pritchett. Selkirk's Return from Assiniboia Via The United States to the Canadas, 1817–1818. The Mississippi Valley Historical Review, Vol. 32, No. 3 (December, 1945), pp. 399–418
 Lucius Gaston Moffatt, Joseph Médard Carrière. A Frenchman Visits Charleston, 1817. The South Carolina Historical and Genealogical Magazine, Vol. 49, No. 3 (July, 1948), pp. 131–154
 Sidney Walter Martin. Ebenezer Kellogg's Visit to Charleston, 1817. The South Carolina Historical and Genealogical Magazine, Vol. 49, No. 1 (January, 1948), pp. 1–14
 F. Gerald Ham. The Prophet and the Mummyjums: Isaac Bullard and the Vermont Pilgrims of 1817. The Wisconsin Magazine of History, Vol. 56, No. 4 (Summer, 1973), pp. 290–299
 Patricia Tyson Stroud. The Founding of the Academy of Natural Sciences of Philadelphia in 1812 and Its Journal in 1817. Proceedings of the Academy of Natural Sciences of Philadelphia, Vol. 147, (1997), pp. 227–236

 
1810s in the United States
United States
United States
Years of the 19th century in the United States